Adriano Santos Spencer, known as Spencer (11 February 1959 – 24 November 2006) was a Cape Verdean football player of Cape Verdean descent.

He played 6 seasons and 117 games in the Primeira Liga for Braga. He played one game for Benfica in the Taça de Portugal.

Club career
He made his Primeira Liga debut for Braga on 30 August 1981 as a late substitute in a 1–0 victory over Rio Ave.

References

1959 births
2006 deaths
People from São Vicente, Cape Verde
Cape Verdean footballers
S.L. Benfica footballers
G.C. Alcobaça players
S.C. Braga players
Académico de Viseu F.C. players
Primeira Liga players
Association football midfielders